Shchukozero is a rural locality (an inhabited locality) in administrative jurisdiction of the closed administrative-territorial formation of Severomorsk in Murmansk Oblast, Russia, located on the Kola Peninsula, beyond the Arctic Circle, at the height of  above sea level. At the 2010 Census, its population was 712.

References

Notes

Sources
Official website of Murmansk Oblast. Registry of the Administrative-Territorial Structure of Murmansk Oblast 

Rural localities in Murmansk Oblast
